Sobieski, Wisconsin is an unincorporated census-designated place in Oconto County in northeastern Wisconsin, United States. It is located within the Town of Little Suamico. As of the 2010 census, its population was 259. It is part of the Green Bay Metropolitan Statistical Area. The Little Suamico Town Hall is located in Sobieski, just east of the Escanaba and Lake Superior Railroad.

Sobieski is located along County Trunk Highway S and Cross Road. Sandalwood Road and Krause Road also enter the community. The Little Suamico River flows just south of the St. Maximilian parish cemetery. County S intersects with U.S. Route 141 about a half-mile east of Sobieski.

Demographics

References
 

Census-designated places in Wisconsin
Census-designated places in Oconto County, Wisconsin
Green Bay metropolitan area